Ernst Müller (born 16 May 1954) is a German boxer. He competed for West Germany in the men's light welterweight event at the 1976 Summer Olympics. He was also the most probable West German runner-up for the 1980 Summer Olympics, but the West German government decided to join the U.S.-imposed boycott, so Müller missed the event together with the rest of the FRG Olympic squad.

References

External links
 

1954 births
Living people
German male boxers
Olympic boxers of West Germany
Boxers at the 1976 Summer Olympics
People from Düren
Sportspeople from Cologne (region)
AIBA World Boxing Championships medalists
Light-welterweight boxers